Gotzon Garate Goihartzun  (1 September 1934 – 1 October 2008) was a Basque and Spanish writer and linguist, collector of Basque dialects, Jesuit theologian.

He made a significant contribution to Basque philology, sequentially from the Castilian tongue scraping borrowing. He was a polyglot, possessed by most of the Romance languages, English, German, Hindi, and a number of other, often while traveling to a country where the language was spoken, for the purpose of its study.

Works

Narration 
Aldarte oneko ipuinak (1982, Gero)
Nafarroako Ezkurran (1981, Gero)
Lehortean (1979)
Muskilak (1980, Mensajero)

Novel 
Zilarrezko gazteluaren kronika urratua (1992, Gero)
Alaba (1984, Elkar)
Hadesen erresumarantz (1983, Elkar)
Izurri berria (1981)
Goizuetako ezkongabeak (1979, Zugaza)
Elizondoko eskutitzak (1977, Gero)
Esku leuna (1977, CAP)

Essay 
Euskal eleberrien kondaira (2001, Gero)
Atzerriko eta Euskal Herriko polizia eleberria (2000, Elkar)
Euskal atsotitzak (1995, Gero)
Marxen marxismoa (1971, Mensajero)
Euskal elaberrien kondaira – 2 (1985, Mensajero)
Leninen marxismoa (1983, Mensajero)
Marxen ondoko errebisionismoa, Rosa Luxemburg (1974, Mensajero)
Lenin eta nazioen autodeterminazioa (1980, Mensajero)
Marx eta nazioa (1972, Mensajero)
Euskal elaberrien kondaira – 3 (1991, Mensajero)

Chronicle 
Zakurra, zeure laguna (2002, Elkar)
India harrigarria (2001, Elkar)
New York City (1988, Elkar)
New Yorkeko kronika beltza eta beste kontu periferiko batzuk (2004, Elkar)

Diccionarios 
Erdarakadak (1988, Gero)

Collectibles 
Lauaxeta menderik mende (2005, Mendebalde Kultur Alkartea)

References

External links 

 Argizaiola 2005: Gotzon Garate, Feria del Libro y del Disco Vasco de Durango  
 L’écrivain basque Gotzon Garate est décédé  
 Gotzon Garate literaturaren zubitegian 
 Atsotitzak on-line 
 Gotzon Garate Euskal Idazleen Elkartearen atarian 
 Barren aldizkarian Gotzon Garateri eskainitiako gehigarri monografikoa 
 "Euskara bihotz zuen idazlea" ("Berria"n) 

Basque writers
1934 births
2008 deaths
Paremiologists
Basque Roman Catholic priests
Basque Jesuits
20th-century Spanish Jesuits
Proverb scholars
People from Elgoibar
Basque-language writers